Varacalli is a surname. Notable people with the surname include:

Ernest Varacalli (born 1944), American mobster
Joseph A. Varacalli (born 1952), American sociologist